Carbonea supersparsa is a species of lichenicolous fungus belonging to the family Lecanoraceae. It is widespread in the Northern Hemisphere. In Iceland it has been reported growing on Lecanora cenisia near Egilsstaðir and Lecanora polytropa near Seyðisfjörður.

References

Lecanoraceae
Fungi described in 1865
Fungi of Iceland
Fungi of Europe
Fungi of North America
Taxa named by William Nylander (botanist)